"Gracias a la vida" (Spanish for "Thanks to life") is a song written, composed and performed by Chilean Violeta Parra, one of the artists who was part of the movement and musical genre known as the Nueva Canción Chilena. Parra composed "Gracias a la vida" in La Paz in 1966. It was included on Las Últimas Composiciones, the last album Parra published before committing suicide in 1967. The song is one of Parra's most renowned. It is performed throughout the world and remains one of the most covered Latin American songs in history.

Critical reception 
The song "Gracias a la vida" was considered as a "humanist hymn" by Marisol García, a journalist specialized in Chilean popular music and creator of the website MusicaPopular. In 2009 the former president Michelle Bachelet expressed her "affection and admiration" for Mercedes Sosa and "Gracias a la vida" with the following phrase: «As you know today, "Gracias a la vida" is a song of ours, but also a universal one. Note that there are many artists from many countries who have recorded it and made it famous and one of those voices, perhaps the most vigorous in Latin America, is that of Mercedes Sosa». In 2013 was inducted into the Latin Grammy Hall of Fame.

Covers 
The 1971 version performed by Mercedes Sosa and included in her album Homenaje a Violeta Parra spread the song within the Spanish-speaking world. Joan Baez popularized the song in the United States in 1974 by including it on her album of the same name, and continued to perform the song in concert in various countries. Italian singer-songwriter Gabriella Ferri covered the song in her 1974 album Remedios, making it popular with the Italian public. In 2021, American singer Kacey Musgraves covered the song for her fifth studio album Star-Crossed.

Voces Unidas por Chile version

In 2010, "Gracias a la Vida" was recorded by the supergroup Voces Unidas por Chile. It was produced by Chilean producer Humberto Gatica, and released in May 12, one week before another charity single for the event, "Que Cante la Vida", performed by various artists too including Alex Ubago, Belinda, Carlos Baute, Aleks Syntek, Luis Fonsi, among others.

The project by Beto Cuevas, former vocalist of the group La Ley, consisted of recording a version of "Gracias a la Vida" to help the victims of the 2010 earthquake, was produced by the Chilean compatriot Humberto Gatica, they also included artists such as: Colombians Shakira and Juanes, Dominican Juan Luis Guerra, Mexican Fernando Olvera (Fher) Spanish Alejandro Sanz and Miguel Bosé, Italian Laura Pausini, and Canadian Michael Bublé.

"We are committed to the Chilean people, which is facing a big problem" said the former vocalist of Maná in a video with statements of all participating artists and images of the tragedy. Bosé said in its segment "Anything that has to be done for that country, I will always do it." Laura Pausini, referring to the earthquake in the area of Abruzzo said "Last year, my land, Italy, experienced a similar tragedy to which Chile is experiencing".

Warner Music edit the song internationally in both physical and digital format, being May 4, 2010, the predestined date where it was going to be published. The profits from their sale went to Habitat for Humanity, which works to provide housing to families in need in various countries, including Chile.

References

External links
 
Gracias a la vida گراسیاس آلا ویدا (+ translation into twelve languages)
Gracias a la vida from BBC Radio 4's series "Soul Music"

Spanish-language songs
Chilean folk songs
Chilean songs
1966 songs
Violeta Parra songs
Latin Grammy Hall of Fame Award recipients
RCA Victor singles
Nueva canción